The Congress for the Republic (CPR-Inganci) is a political party in Niger.

History
The party was established in September 2014 by former mayor of Maradi Kassoum Moctar.

Moctar was the party's presidential candidate in the 2016 general elections, but failed to advance to the second round. However, the CPR won three seats in the National Assembly.

Electoral results

President of Niger

National Assembly

References

Political parties in Niger
Political parties established in 2014
2014 establishments in Niger